Rodolfo Solano Quirós is a Costa Rican politician. , he serves as Minister of Foreign Affairs and Worship.

References 

Living people
Year of birth missing (living people)
Place of birth missing (living people)
Foreign ministers of Costa Rica
21st-century Costa Rican politicians